Vanden Plas is the name of a former coachbuilders, later used as a car badge by BMC and most recently, Jaguar.

Vanden Plas may also refer to:

 Vanden Plas (band), a German progressive metal band
 Camille Van den Plas (1850–1902), Belgian soldier, accountant and colonial administrator.
 Louise van den Plas (1877–1968), Belgian suffragist and founder of the first Christian feminist movement in Belgium

See also
 
 Vanden, a prefix in Dutch language surnames
 Plas (disambiguation)
 Van der Plas